The Ukrainian Embassy in Bern is the diplomatic mission of Ukraine to the Swiss Confederation and the Principality of Liechtenstein. Since 2022, Iryna Venediktova has been the ambassador.

Ambassadors

See also
Switzerland–Ukraine relations

References

Switzerland–Ukraine relations
Bern
Ukraine